Ellis Raymond "Old Folks" Kinder (July 26, 1914 – October 16, 1968) was an American Major League Baseball pitcher with the St. Louis Browns, Boston Red Sox, St. Louis Cardinals and the Chicago White Sox between 1946 and 1957. Kinder batted and threw right-handed. He was born in Atkins, Arkansas.

Despite making his MLB debut as a 31-year-old rookie, Kinder had a reputable career. He is one of few pitchers in baseball history who won or saved a combined total of at least 200 games, and who were primarily starters for at least a third of their career.

Kinder was among the best starting pitchers in the American League in 1949, going 23–6 and leading the league in shutouts (6) and a .793 winning percentage, with a 130 adjusted ERA. In fact, Kinder's ERA+ for his four years as a starter were 87, 117, 130 and 115. Then, in 1951, the Red Sox, desperate for a relief pitcher, moved him to the pen where he shined as the best reliever in the AL until 1955.

In his 12-year career, Kinder compiled a 102–71 record with 749 strikeouts, a 3.43 ERA, 56 complete games, 10 shutouts, 102 saves, and 1479.2 innings pitched in 484 games.

On May 17, 1947, a seagull flew over Fenway Park and dropped a three-pound smelt on Kinder while he was pitching for the St. Louis Browns. Nevertheless, Kinder beat Boston 4–2.

Ellis Kinder died in Jackson, Tennessee, at the age of 54, after undergoing open-heart surgery.

Highlights
 Twice Top 10 MVP (1949, 1951)
 Twice led league in winning percentage (1949, 1951)
 Led league in shutouts (1949)
 Twice led league in games pitched (63, 1951; 69, 1953)
 Twice led league in saves (1951, 1953)
 Pitched a 10 inning scoreless relief win-game (1951) (On July 12, 1951, Kinder took over to start the eighth inning and held the Chicago White Sox scoreless for 10 innings. The Red Sox finally scored a run in the 17th inning to win, 5–4.) 
 The Sporting News Pitcher of the Year (1949)

See also
 List of Major League Baseball annual saves leaders
 List of Major League Baseball annual shutout leaders

External links
Biography in hometown newspaper. Russellville, Arkansas 

1914 births
1968 deaths
Baseball players from Arkansas
Binghamton Triplets players
Boston Red Sox players
Chicago White Sox players
Jackson Generals (KITTY League) players
Jackson Senators players
Major League Baseball pitchers
Memphis Chickasaws players
People from Pope County, Arkansas
St. Louis Browns players
St. Louis Cardinals players
San Diego Padres (minor league) players